DSFA Records was a Dutch record label. The name stands for "Doesn't Stand For Anything". Known bands for the label are Within Temptation, Trail Of Tears and The Gauntlet. The label has been defunct for several years.

See also
 List of record labels

Dutch record labels
Alternative rock record labels